Debra Frances "Camryn" Manheim (born March 8, 1961) is an American actress known for her roles as attorney Ellenor Frutt on ABC's The Practice, Delia Banks on CBS's Ghost Whisperer, Gladys Presley in the 2005 miniseries Elvis, and "Control" on Person of Interest. In 1999, Manheim won the Primetime Emmy Award for Outstanding Supporting Actress in a Drama Series for her work on The Practice. Since 2022, she has been part of the main cast of the revival of Law & Order.

Early life
Manheim was born in West Caldwell, New Jersey, into a Jewish family, the daughter of Sylvia (née Nuchow), a teacher, and Jerome Manheim, a mathematics professor and the Dean of Letters and Science at California State University Long Beach. Her family relocated several times in her early childhood due to her father taking new teaching positions, and she spent her early years in Michigan and Peoria, Illinois. 

When she was in sixth grade, her family relocated to Southern California, settling in Long Beach, where she attended Woodrow Wilson Classical High School. She became interested in acting after working at a Renaissance faire during high school. Manheim graduated from University of California, Santa Cruz with a BFA degree in 1984 and New York University's Tisch School of the Arts Graduate Acting Program with an MFA degree in 1987. Her brother, Karl Manheim, is a law professor at Loyola Law School.

Career

Manheim worked for a while as a sign language interpreter at hospitals. Her knowledge of sign language was used on The Practice, in an episode of Law & Order, and in her role as a child behavioral psychologist in the movie Mercury Rising. In 1983, she made a brief appearance as a girl in an elevator in Sudden Impact in the post-courtroom scene at the beginning.

Manheim's breakthrough was her one-woman show "Wake Up, I'm Fat", which played off-Broadway at Classic Stage Company in 1994. She adapted the show into a book of the same name, which was published by Broadway Books in 1999.

In 1999, Manheim won an Emmy for her work on The Practice. In 1999, she was awarded the Women in Film Lucy Award.

In 2005, Manheim earned Golden Globe and Emmy nominations for her work in the miniseries Elvis, and the following year she joined the cast of Ghost Whisperer. Her other television credits include Chicago Hope, Ally McBeal, Family Guy, Will & Grace, Boston Public, Two and a Half Men, The L Word, How I Met Your Mother, Hannah Montana, and Person of Interest. She also voiced Juliet in the episode "Company Picnic" of Dilbert on UPN in 2000.

In addition, Manheim has several film credits. These include Romy and Michele's High School Reunion, Happiness (which earned the cast a National Board of Review Award for Best Acting by an Ensemble), The Laramie Project, Scary Movie 3, Dark Water and An Unfinished Life.

In 2015, Manheim was in the Deaf West production of the musical Spring Awakening as Adult Women. The production, which had a cast composed half of hearing actors and half of deaf or hard-of-hearing actors, paired every deaf actor (who signed their lines in American Sign Language) with a hearing actor who said their lines verbally. Manheim voiced for Marlee Matlin as well as signing her own dialogue in the parts of Frau Bergmann, Fräulein Großebüstenhalter, and Fräulein Knuppeldick.

In August 2019, she was elected secretary-treasurer of the SAG-AFTRA union. Manheim was elected to the secretary-treasurer position with 16,047 votes. Candidates Jodi Long, Chuck Slavin and Rob Stats received 10,251, 2,204 and 1,790 votes respectively. She did not run for reelection in 2021, and was succeeded by Joely Fisher.

Personal life
Manheim's son Milo, conceived via sperm donation from her close friend Jeffrey Brezovar, was born on March 6, 2001.

Manheim has been involved with the Los Angeles-based charity Bet Tzedek Legal Services – The House of Justice, serving as a co-chair for their annual fundraiser, the Justice Ball.

Filmography

Film

Television

Awards and nominations

References

External links

1961 births
Living people
20th-century American actresses
21st-century American actresses
Actresses from Long Beach, California
Actresses from New Jersey
American feminists
American film actresses
Jewish American actresses
American television actresses
American voice actresses
Best Supporting Actress Golden Globe (television) winners
Feminist artists
Jewish feminists
American LGBT rights activists
Tisch School of the Arts alumni
University of California, Santa Cruz alumni
People from Caldwell, New Jersey
Outstanding Performance by a Supporting Actress in a Drama Series Primetime Emmy Award winners
Wilson Classical High School alumni